Teapacks (also known as Tipex) is an Israeli band that formed in 1988 as HaHotzaa La'Poal (Hebrew: , The Execution) in the southern Israeli city of Sderot. Originally the band was named after the correction fluid Tipp-Ex, but in 1995 the transliteration was changed so as not to infringe on the well-known brand, while keeping the pronunciation and spelling in Hebrew the same.

Each member of the band has a diverse background, and as a whole the band has Tunisian, Moroccan, Bulgarian, Romanian, Syrian, Polish, Russian, and Yemenite heritage. Teapacks gained popularity by bringing forward traditional Israeli-oriental music combined with light humorous hints. The band leader, Kobi Oz, is well known within Israel for his eccentric looks and style. The band has released eight albums plus a greatest hits collection, which collectively have sold over 300,000 copies. Teapacks has been chosen “Band of the Year” numerous times by Israeli radio stations.

History

Early years: 1988-1994 
HaHotzaa LaPoal began on 6 November 1988 when vocalist/keyboardist Kobi Oz and bassist Gal Peremen met at a kibbutz in southern Israel. They began playing songs written by Oz and were soon joined by guitarist Einav Cohen and drummer Tamir Yemini. The group held their first concert at Kibbutz Dorot in December 1988. They released two singles, "Silonim" (Jets) and "Lispor kvasim" (Counting Sheep), in 1988 and 1989 respectively, under Oz' name. In 1989, Yemini and Cohen left HaHotzaa LaPoal and were replaced by Yoav Nagar and Ram Yosifov. Later that year, the group changed their name to Tipex and released a five-song demo tape. According to Oz, the name symbolized "wip[ing] out differences between people". They performed the songs "Lispor kvasim" and "Im yipol gorale" (If Fate Were to Befall Us) at a festival in February 1990.

In September that year, the band, comprising Oz, Peremen, Cohen and Nagar, recorded two songs, "Haavel" (The Injustice) and "Boi Elai" (Come To Me). At the end of that year, Yosifov returned to Tipex, replacing Cohen. To this day, Oz, Peremen and Yosifov remain the sole constant members of the band since 1991 and are often identified with the band. In 1991, Nagar left the group and was replaced by Avinoam Marton. This lineup released their debut album Shvil klipot hagarinim in September 1992, featuring the hit single "Harabi Joe Capara" (Rabbi Joe Capara). They were midway through recording the followup, Haacharon baasiron hatachton (The Last of the Lower Class), when Yemini returned to the band, replacing Marton. The album was released in November 1993 featuring the hits "Betoch niyar eiton" (Rolled Up in a Newspaper), "Zmanim ktanim" (Small Times) and "Anana" (Cloud).

First success and departure of Yemini: 1995-1998 
In 1995, the group renamed themselves initially to Tea Packs (the space was later dropped), due to Oz finding out that people were using Tipp-Ex fluid as a recreational drug, and released their third album, Hachaim shelcha belafa (Your Life in a Lapha). It featured the singles "Ma asit?" (What Have You Done?), "Yesh li chavera" (I Have a Girlfriend), "Vehapam shir ahava" (Yet Another Love Song) and "Hatachana hayeshana" (The Old Station). The following year, the group recorded the soundtrack to the hit comedy film Dogs are Colour Blind. Oz also shaved his head.

Neshika ladod, the group's fifth album, was released in 1997, featuring the singles "Lama halacht mimenu" (Why Did You Leave Me?, a duet with the then-unknown Sarit Hadad), "Stam" (Simply) and "Eize olam" (What a World). Yemini left the group after the tour to support the album. He was replaced with Motti Yosef. The group also took on Dani Aberjel as second guitarist, Noam Yankelevich as keyboardist and Meir "Big M" Amar as DJ, sampler and sound engineer. This is the lineup of Teapacks most recognised outside Israel, since they performed at Eurovision 2007.

Later years: 1999-2007 
The first release with this lineup was "Disko menayak" (Disco Maniac - "Maniac" being a derogatory term for the police), with the hits "Sami veSomo" (Sami and Somo), "Shalosh balayla" (3 in the night) and "Kshani eitcha ani kemo dag" (When I'm With You I'm Like a Fish). In 2001, they released Yoshvim bebeit kafe (Sitting in a Cafe), from which the title track and "Kemo lifnei 20 shana" (Like It Was 20 Years Ago) were released as singles.

In 2002, the band released the non-album single "Avaryan tzatzua" (Petty Criminal), a tie-in song to Oz' book of the same name, which was released concurrently with the song. The following year, they released the non-album singles "Hayamim haacherim" (Other Days) and "Kol yom ani kimaat" (Every Day I Feel...).

In June 2003, Teapacks released the single "Rikudei amba" (Amba Dancing - a parody of the rikudei am dances popular in Israel) and their greatest hits album Kol halehitim, featuring a bonus disc Haosef Haalternateapacks containing "Avaryan tzatzua", "Kol yom ani kimaat", five more songs from their albums and five remixes. Kol halehitim also featured a cover of the Israeli national anthem Hatikva, performed with Sarit Hadad. A Russian version of "Rikudei amba", "Tantsuyem amba", was also recorded, being released for free from the Teapacks website at that time and as a B-side to a promotional single.

In 2005, the group released the non-album single "Sof hashavua masiba" (Weekend Party). The following year, they released the album Radio/Musika/Ivrit (either "Radio/Music/Hebrew" or "Radio Hebrew Music"), featuring the singles "Kluv shel zahav" (Cage of Gold) and "Perach ha-shchunot" (Flower of the Community). The song "Hora nadlanim' (Real Estate Agent's Hora) was also translated into English and released as "Money Trees Forever".

Eurovision and breakup: 2007-2009 
On 7 January 2007, Teapacks were internally selected by IBA's Eurovision Committee to represent Israel in the Eurovision Song Contest held in Helsinki, Finland. On 27 February 2007, Teapacks performed four songs, "Push the Button", "Salam Salami", "12 Points" and "Voulez Vous", in a TV special. "Push the Button" was chosen as the Israeli entry for the 2007 Eurovision Contest by popular vote.

The band performed "Push the Button" at the Eurovision Semi Finals on 10 May 2007, but it failed to qualify for the finals. The song was controversial because of references to Iran and nuclear war.

Teapacks officially disbanded on 1 January 2009. In an interview with Mako on 10 November 2008, Oz stated that the three constant members (himself, Yosifov and Peremen) had become tired of working together. During their breakup, Oz released two solo albums, Mizmorei nevochim (Psalms for the Perplexed) and Mizmorim nosafim (More Psalms), while Yosifov concentrated on teaching guitar and collaborated with Moran Cohen-Talmor on several albums.

Reunion and return of Yemini: 2014-present 

In 2014, Teapacks reformed and began to tour. Their latest album, Avodat kapayim (Manual Labour), was released in September 2016, preceded by the singles "Mi haprovintsial" (What's With the Provincial), "Tsemed ayalot" (Two Deer), "Layla layla tov (Good Night, Good Night), "Avodat kapayim" and "Lo haya lano klum" (We Had Nothing). Yemini also returned to Teapacks, but during his time away from them, he had become an Orthodox Jew. Due to this, when the video to "Mi haprovintzial" was filmed in February 2016, he was replaced with Motti Yosef. Oz explained in an interview with Israel Hayom the rabbinical hoops the band had to jump through to keep performing with Yemini. The live show since 2014 features a PowerPoint presentation with the lyrics running behind the band, synced with the songs. This is a habit Oz brought to the group from his solo work - new band members Adam Mader (mandolin), Sefi Hirsch (violin), Shachar Yampolsky (keyboards, acoustic guitar), Danielle Krief (backing vocals) and Noam Chen (percussion) all played in Oz' solo band and joined Teapacks in 2014.

A website called ooooiiii.com, featuring the chorus of "Harabi Joe Capara" on a loop, was created in 2006 and became popular in 2011 after being featured on Vsauce.

Discography

Studio albums 
 Shvil Klipot Hagarinim (The Path of Sunflower Seeds) - 1992
 Ha'acharon Ba'asiron Hatachton (The Last of the Lower Class) - 1993
 Hachaim Shelcha Be'laffa (Your Life in a Laffa) - 1995
 Klavim Lo Novchim Beyarok (Dogs Do Not Bark When It’s Green) - 1996 (Motion Picture Soundtrack)
 Neshika Ladod (A Kiss to the Uncle) - 1997
 Disco Menayak (Disco Jerk; this word is also a derogatory slang for a Police officer) - 1999
 Yoshvim Beveit Caffe (Sitting in a Coffee Shop) - 2001
 Radio Musica Ivrit (Radio Hebrew Music) - 2006
 Avodat Kapayim (Manual Labour) - 2016

Compilations 
 Kol Halehitim (Hit Collection) - 2003
 Haosef Haromanti (Romantic Collection) - 2010
 Shirim Nosafim (More Songs) - 2016

Singles 
 Silonim - 1988
 Lispor kvasim - 1989
 Harabi Joe Capara - 1992
 Ani ohev otech - 1992
 Rikud ha-Pasadoble - 1992
 Im yipol gorale - 1993
 Hadoar ba hayom - 1993
 Em ve achot - 1993
 Shir ha-PAZAM - 1993
 Betoch niyar iton - 1994
 Zmanim ktanim - 1994
 Ma asit? - 1995
 Yesh li chavera - 1995
 Vehapam shir ahava - 1995
 Gever romanti - 1996
 Eize olam - 1997
 Lama halacht mimenu feat. Sarit Hadad - 1997
 Stam - 1997
 Sami ve Somo - 1999
 Shalosh balayla - 1999
 Kshani eitcha ani kemo dag - 2000
 Yoshvim bebeit kafe - 2001
 Kmo lifnei esrim shana - 2001
 Avaryan tzatzua - 2002
 Rikudei amba - 2003
 Hayamim haacharim - 2003
 Kol yom ani kimaat - 2003
 Sof hashavua mesiba - 2005
 Ten li chatima - 2006
 Kluv shel zahav - 2006
 Hora nadlanim - 2006
 Push the Button - 2007
 Mi haprovintzial - 2016
 Tsemed aylot - 2016
 Layla layla tov - 2016
 Ma iti? - 2016
 Avodat kapayim - 2016
 Lo haya lano klum - 2016

Music videos 
 Ani rotze leshachpel otach (Svika Pick cover)
 Harabi Joe Capara (early demo from 1991)
 Harabi Joe Capara
 Yaron Zehavi beshvil klipot hagarinim
 Hadoar ba hayom
 Shir belachatz
 Betoch niyar iton
 Anana
 Shir ha-PAZAM
 Ma asit?
 Yesh li chavera
 Vehapam shir ahava
 Hachaim shelcha belafa
 Eize olam
 Od shabat
 Lama halacht mimenu
 Stam
 Sami ve Somo
 Shifchat hazorem
 Yoshvim bebeit kafe
 Kmo lifnei esrim shana
 Veat veat veat
 Ilu hayit
 Rikudei amba
 Kol yom ani kimaat
 Kluv shel zahav
 Hora nadlanim
 Ten li chatima
 Push the Button
 Mi haprovintsial
 Layla layla tov (lyric video)
 Ma iti?
 Avodat kapayim
 #BBBBBB (with BEMET)

Personnel

Current lineup 
 Kobi Oz - lead vocals (1988–present), keyboards (1988-1990)
 Ram Yosifov - guitar, mandolin, backing vocals (1989-1990, 1991–present)
 Gal Peremen - bass, backing vocals (1988–present)
 Tamir Yemini - drums, backing vocals (1988-1989, 1993-1997, 2001–2002, 2014–present)
 Shahar Yampolsky - keyboards, acoustic guitar (2014–present)
 Danielle Krief - female lead vocals, backing vocals (2014–present)
 Adam Mader - whistle, trumpet, mandolin, violin, backing vocals (2014–present)
 Sefi Asfuri Hirsch - violin, accordion (2014–present)
 Noam Chen - drums (2014–present)

Past members 
 Einav Cohen - guitar (1988-1989, 1990)
 Yoav Nagar - drums (1989-1991)
 Avinoam Marton - drums (1991-1993)
 Ronit Shefi - accordion, keyboards, backing vocals (1993-1994)
 Sharon Ben Zadok - backing vocals, tambourine, dancing (1994-1996)
 Uri Miles - accordion (1995-1998)
 Nuriel Amar - violin (1995-1998)
 Dani Aberjel - guitar (1998-2009)
 Moti Joseph - drums (1998-2000, 2002-2009)
 Noam Yankelevich - keyboards (1998-2009)
 Meir Amar - DJ, sound effects, samples, backing vocals (1998-2009)

References

External links

 Teapacks on Facebook
 Teapacks on Twitter
 Teapacks on Bandcamp

Israeli ethnic musical groups
Eurovision Song Contest entrants for Israel
Eurovision Song Contest entrants of 2007
Israeli rock music groups
Israeli pop music groups
Musical groups established in 1988
Musical groups disestablished in 2008
Musical groups reestablished in 2014
Sderot